Operation Gatekeeper was a measure implemented during the presidency of Bill Clinton by the United States Border Patrol (then a part of the Immigration and Naturalization Service (INS)), aimed at halting illegal immigration to the United States at the United States–Mexico border near San Diego, California. According to the INS, the goal of Gatekeeper was "to restore integrity and safety to the nation's busiest border."

Operation Gatekeeper was announced in Los Angeles on September 17, 1994, by U.S. Attorney General Janet Reno, and was launched two weeks later on October 1.

The United States Congress allocated  additional funds to the Border Patrol and other agencies. By 1997, the budget of the Immigration and Naturalization Service had doubled to 800 million dollars, the number of Border Patrol agents had nearly doubled, the amount of fencing or other barriers more than doubled, and the number of underground sensors nearly tripled.

The merits of Operation Gatekeeper were debated extensively, including during congressional hearings. The Department of Justice, the INS, and the Border Patrol maintained that Operation Gatekeeper was a success. Some members of Congress and others sharply criticized the program and declared it a failure.

Phases
The first phase of Gatekeeper focused on the 5 5/8 westernmost miles of the border, extending from the Pacific Ocean to the San Ysidro Port of Entry near San Diego.  U.S. migration routes immediately shifted eastward, and the use of professional human smugglers known as coyotes or polleros increased. In May 1995, the Border Patrol initiated Operation Disruption to target human smugglers, and also established new checkpoints on interior highways.

Phase two, although not formally part of Gatekeeper, was launched in October 1995. It consisted of the appointment of Alan Bersin as the Attorney General's Special Representative on Southwest Border Issues and the establishment of the first immigration court at the actual boundary, inside the San Ysidro Port of Entry. The court expedited hearings and subsequent deportations of undocumented immigrants apprehended attempting to enter the U.S. with false documents or through false representation.

Phase two also introduced IDENT, an automated biometric identification system, to facilitate identification of repeat offenders and "criminal aliens", i.e., illegal immigrants with criminal records or active warrants for their arrest. The Border Patrol also intensified relations with local law enforcement agencies to counter the flow of migrants through the Otay Mountains.

Allegations of NAFTA enforcement

Academic Noam Chomsky has said that Operation Gatekeeper was a "militarization of the U.S.-Mexican border" and alleges it was because North American Free Trade Agreement would have increased illegal immigration into the United States; therefore, Gatekeeper was a precaution to stop future illegal immigration.

See also
 Greaser Act
 Operation Wetback
 Esequiel Hernández Jr.

References

Border control
Mexico–United States border
History of immigration to the United States
Law enforcement operations in the United States